Robert Long (22 October 1943 in Utrecht as Jan Gerrit Bob Arend (Bob) Leverman – 13 December 2006 in Antwerp) was a Dutch singer and television presenter.

Biography
Under the stage name "Bob Revel" he founded the band The Yelping Jackals in 1963. In 1967 he moved to another band, called Unit Gloria (at that time using the name Gloria). In 1971 he began to sing solo, under the name "Robert Long", a reference to his height. Only a year later he left Unit Gloria to concentrate on his solo career. He started singing in English, but not long after that he also began to sing self-written songs in Dutch. His Dutch songs were critical of Dutch society and of American politics. Of his first Dutch album in 1974, Vroeger of Later (Sooner or Later) more than half a million records were sold and continued to be a best seller for 118 consecutive weeks. During this period the album reached the top of the charts three times. Also his second album Levenslang (Lifelong) scored well with sales of more than 300,000. In 1977 he was awarded the first of a total of six Edison Music Awards. During the 80s he scored a top 10 hit in the Netherlands with his song "Iedereen doet 't" (Everybody does it). Subsequent albums also sold well.

In the late 80s Long appeared on television presenting a show called Mijn geheim (My secret). Despite this new career he received some negative reactions, although the show itself was successful. Soon afterwards he switched to another television network, presenting Tien voor taal (An A for spelling).

In 1986 Long began writing columns for the Dutch newspaper Algemeen Dagblad. A selection of these columns was released in a book in 1990 using the title Vandaag geen nieuws (No news today). During this period he presented the television show Fantastico. Together with Dimitri Frenkel Frank Long composed the Dutch musical Chekhov (based upon the life of the Russian writer Anton Chekhov), which was a big success in the Netherlands, but the German version in which Long also participated, was less popular.

In 1998 a revealing book containing letters was released. Letters about life, death, love, sex, work and colleagues were made public by him and Cees van der Pluijm using the title Beste Robert, Waarde Cees.

On 8 September 2005 Long suffered a myocardial infarction and was treated with angioplasty. Later that year, on 6 December 2005 Long married his Belgian boyfriend and manager Kristof Rutsaert, 28 years his junior. The marriage ceremony was performed by fellow singer and actor Gerard Cox, a close friend of Long. On 4 December 2006 it was announced he was suffering from a terminal illness as he was admitted to hospital with cancer. Robert Long died on 13 December 2006 at 11 pm in a hospital in Antwerp at the age of 63.

Discography

Albums
1974 Vroeger of later – NED: 2× Platinum
1975–1976 Scherts, satire, songs & ander snoepgoed (play from a theatre show with Robert Long, Jenny Arean, Jerôme Reehuis and Dimitri Frenkel Frank)
1977 Levenslang –  NED: Platinum
1980 Homo Sapiens – NED: Gold
1984 Dag kleine jongen – NED: Platinum
1984 Liefste, mijn liefste
1986 Achter de horizon – NED: Platinum
1988 Hartstocht – NED: Gold
1988 Goud op zilver – NED: Gold
1989 Liedjes uit de krullentijd
1990 Het onherroepelijke FANTASTICO album
1992 Voor mijn vrienden – NED: Gold
1993 Het allerbeste van (subtitle: 50 jaar goed ter been en nog geen lintje) – NED: Gold
1994 In die dagen
1994 Uit liefde en respect – NED: Gold
1996 Nu
1997 Uit liefde en respect voor Gershwin
1999 Lang genoeg jong
2000 Vanavond tussen 8 en 11 LIVE
2002 Brand!
2006  'n Duivels Genoegen

Singles
1973 Let us try
1973 I believe in love
1984 Heeft een kind een toekomst
1986 Iedereen doet 't
1987 Geef ons vrede
1988 Ai lof joe so
1988 Vanmorgen vloog ze nog

Theater
 1974 – Robert Long (met Cobi Schreijer)
 1975 – Scherts, satire, songs en ander snoepgoed (met Jenny Arean, Dimitri Frenkel Frank en Jérôme Reehuis)
 1976 – En dat is twee (met Nelleke Burg)
 1977 – Levenslang (met Ansje van Brandenberg)
 1978 – Wat ieder meisje weten moet (met Dimitri Frenkel Frank)
 1980 – Duidelijk zo!? (met Leen Jongewaard)
 1982 – Tot hiertoe (heeft de Heere ons geholpen) (met Leen Jongewaard)
 1983 – En het bleef nog lang onrustig in de stad (met Leen Jongewaard)
 1978 – Swingpop (musical)
 1995 – Nu (solo)
 1999 – Lang genoeg jong
 2000 – Cole Porter's songbook
 2002 – Brand (solo)
 2004 – Kerstconcert

TV
1989–???? Disney's Adventures of the Gummi Bears – Singer Dutch language title song

References

External links

Official website 
Nationaal Popinstituut Profile 
Nationaal Popinstituut Discography

1943 births
2006 deaths
Dutch pop singers
20th-century Dutch male singers
Dutch comedy musicians
Dutch satirists
Dutch LGBT singers
Dutch gay musicians
Musicians from Utrecht (city)
Deaths from cancer in Belgium
Gay singers
Mass media people from Utrecht (city)
20th-century Dutch LGBT people
21st-century Dutch LGBT people